Marc Warren (born 20 March 1967) is an English actor, known for his British television roles. His roles have included Albert Blithe in Band of Brothers, Danny Blue in Hustle, Dougie Raymond in The Vice, Dominic Foy in State of Play, Rick in Mad Dogs, the Comte de Rochefort in The Musketeers and the Gentleman in Jonathan Strange & Mr Norrell, and Piet Van Der Valk in TV series Van Der Valk.

Career
Warren made his professional debut in May 1986 when he appeared at The Northampton Theatre Royal in Stags and Hens. Warren has consistently worked in film, television, theatre and radio. He was a member of the National Youth Theatre and trained at the East 15 Acting School (although he did not graduate). He played Billy Casper in Kes at the Birmingham Rep studio (as well as on their UK small scale and schools tour) directed by John Herriman for the Snap Theatre Company. Warren continued his career with a role in a 1988 production of Godspell which he won by writing to the producers, and went unrepresented until the following year. In 1991 he played Lot in a production of The Seven Descents of Myrtle at the Redgrave Theatre in Farnham.

He had his first major film breakthrough with the 1992 BBC film An Ungentlemanly Act, in which he played Tony Hunt. He played Dougie Raymond in the British television series The Vice and Albert Blithe in HBO's mini-series Band of Brothers. His first recurring television role was in Grange Hill. In 1995, Warren starred in Boston Kickout. In 1996 Warren played Immortal Morgan D'Estaing in the season four Highlander: The Series episode "Double Jeopardy". Warren worked in the production of digital storyboards (as a stand-in for Ewan McGregor) in Star Wars: Episode I – The Phantom Menace.

In 2000, he was presented a Royal Television Society award for his role as Monks in the ITV production of Oliver Twist. In 2001 he appeared in the television drama Men Only as Mac, the husband of Katie (Esther Hall). In 2002, he played Dr. Ivo Steadman in No Night Is Too Long, a British film adapted from the novel of the same name. He played key supporting character Dominic Foy in the 2003 BBC serial State of Play. He played Danny Blue (a main character) in BBC TV series Hustle from series 1–4.

In June 2006 he played the character Elton Pope in the Doctor Who episode "Love & Monsters".

In December 2006 he appeared as the crazed assassin Mr. Teatime in Sky1's adaptation of Hogfather by Terry Pratchett. The same month he played Count Dracula in a new adaptation of Bram Stoker's classic novel, produced by ITV Productions for BBC Wales. The TV film, which aired in December, received viewing figures of 5.23 million.

In February 2007 he appeared as casino-operating villain Tony Crane in the second series of BBC drama Life on Mars. In December 2007 he played Mr. John Simpson in the BBC production of Ballet Shoes with Emilia Fox and Emma Watson. In January 2008 Warren starred in the Messiah series Messiah V: The Rapture taking over the main role from Ken Stott. In the 2008 film Wanted, he played a small role as The Repairman, a member of The Fraternity.

In 2009 he starred in a revival of Martin McDonagh's The Pillowman at the Curve theatre in Leicester, playing Katurian, for which he was nominated for a TMA award. Warren can be heard on television and radio ads in UK. He joined Alexander Armstrong in lending his voice for the launch advertisements for Zurich Connect from July 2009.

Warren starred as Ray Say in a West End revival of The Rise and Fall of Little Voice alongside Diana Vickers and Lesley Sharp from October 2009 to January 2010. In May 2010, he played Steve Strange in Worried About The Boy, a BBC production due about the life of Boy George. The following year, Warren initiated and starred in a new Sky One production, Mad Dogs (alongside Max Beesley, Philip Glenister and John Simm), which eventually ran to fourteen episodes over four series.

September 2011 saw Warren return to the theatre to play the charismatic rebel Cool Hand Luke. Emma Reeves' new adaptation of Donn Pearce's novel Cool Hand Luke was directed by Andrew Loudon and ran for a limited season from 23 September 2011 to 7 January 2012 at the Aldwych Theatre, London.

He reprised his role of Danny Blue in Hustle for the series' final episode. He joined the cast of the American drama The Good Wife in 2012 in a recurring role of Kalinda Sharma's estranged husband. He played Rochefort in the BBC drama The Musketeers, and appeared as The Gentleman in Jonathan Strange & Mr Norrell on the BBC. Since 2020, he has starred as the title character in the detective series Van der Valk.

Personal life
In late 1979 Warren moved from Northamptonshire to Farnborough, Hampshire. He attended Cove Senior School between 1980 and 1982, before moving back north to his hometown.

Filmography

Film

Television

References

External links
 

1967 births
English male film actors
English male television actors
English male stage actors
English male radio actors
Living people
People from Northampton
21st-century English male actors
20th-century English male actors
People from Farnborough, Hampshire
Actors from Northamptonshire
Male actors from Hampshire
National Youth Theatre members